The Spring Hill Farm is a historic farm in Hamilton, Virginia. Dating back to 1830, it was listed on the National Register of Historic Places in 2005. The listing included five contributing buildings.

The main building has a telescope plan design and is built with Flemish bond brickwork.

References

Houses on the National Register of Historic Places in Virginia
National Register of Historic Places in Loudoun County, Virginia
Houses completed in 1830
Houses in Loudoun County, Virginia
1830 establishments in Virginia